Neritona (common name: nerite snails), is a genus of small aquatic snails with an operculum, marine, brackish water, and sometimes freshwater gastropod mollusks in the family Neritidae, the nerites.

Species 
Species in the genus Neritona include:
 Neritona granosa (G. B. Sowerby I, 1825)
 Neritona juttingae (Mienis, 1973)
 Neritona labiosa (G. B. Sowerby I, 1836)
 Neritona macgillivrayi (Reeve, 1855)
 Neritona melanesica Riech, 1935
 Neritona planissima (Mousson, 1869)
Species brought into synonymy
 Neritona latissima (Broderip, 1833): synonym of Clypeolum latissimum (Broderip, 1833)
 † Neritona martensi Brusina, 1884: synonym of † Theodoxus martensi (Brusina, 1884)

References

External links
 Martens, E. von. (1869). [Über die Deckel der Schneckengattungen Neritina, Nerita, und Navicella. Sitzungsberichte der Gesellschaft naturforschender Freude zu Berlin. 1869: 21-23]
 Gray, J. E. (1847). A list of the genera of recent Mollusca, their synonyma and types. Proceedings of the Zoological Society of London. (1847) 15: 129-219
 Benson, W. H. (1856). Descriptions of three new species of Paludomus from Burmah, and of some forms of Stenothyra (Nematura) from Penang, Mergui, etc. Annals and Magazine of Natural History, Series 2. 17(102): 494-504
 Martens, E. von. (1863-1879). Die Gattung Neritina. In: Küster, H. C.; Kobelt, W., Weinkauff, H. C., Eds. Systematisches Conchylien-Cabinet von Martini und Chemnitz. Neu herausgegeben und vervollständigt. Zweiten Bandes zehnte Abtheilung. 1-303, pls A, 1-23. Nürnberg: Bauer & Raspe. 

Neritidae